The Newlincs EfW facility is an incinerator which is located in Grimsby, North East Lincolnshire, England. The plant is operated by Cyclerval UK & TIRU Group under a PFI contract. The engineering of the facility is unusual as it consists of an oscillating kiln handling 56,000 tonnes of waste per year/7 tonnes per hour of waste. The facility is capable of generating 3.2 MW electricity.

See also
List of incinerators in the UK

References

External links

Newlincs
Photo of facility

Buildings and structures in Grimsby